A.C. ChievoVerona played its third consecutive season in Serie A, and nearly equaled 7th place from the 2002-03 Serie A season.
The club finished 9th in Serie A and was eliminated by Perugia in the round of 16 of Coppa Italia.

Competitions

Serie A

References

A.C. ChievoVerona seasons
Chievo